Keres are female death spirits in Greek mythology.

Keres may also refer to:

People with the surname
 Emil Keres (1925–2016), Hungarian actor 
 Harald Keres (1912–2010), Estonian physicist
 Paul Keres (1916–1975), Estonian chess grandmaster
 Robert Keres (1907–1946), Estonian basketball player

Other uses
 Keres people, a subdivision of the Puebloan peoples in New Mexico
 Keresan languages, languages or dialects spoken by Keres peoples
 Keres (launcher), an Israeli transporter erector launcher for AGM-78 Standard ARM missiles
 Kereš, a river in Hungary and Serbia

Estonian-language surnames